Al-Husayn II ibn Mahmud (5 March 1784 – 20 May 1835) was the Bey of Tunis from 1824 until his death in 1835. He was of a Greek descent royal family.

See also
Hussein Khodja

References

1835 deaths
 
1784 births
Tunisian people of Turkish descent 
Tunisian royalty
Flag designers